Horsens Fjord is an East Jutland-type fjord in the east coast of the Danish peninsula of Jutland which stretches from the islands of Alrø and Hjarnø in the east to the town of Horsens on the mainland.

The islands in the fjord are low-lying with grasslands and lagoons along their coasts. Both Alrø and Hjarnø consist principally of farmland while Vorsø, which has been an unpopulated nature reserve for over 50 years, is now wooded and has a colony of herons. There are also many cormorants in the area.

Protections
Horsens Fjord forms a 42,737 ha Ramsar protection together with the island of Endelave and surrounding sea. The protection was put into force on 2 September 1977 and has number 152.

See also 
 Horsens
 Nakskov Fjord

References

External links 

Fjords of Denmark
Ramsar sites in Denmark
Horsens Municipality
Kattegat